The Toulouse Marathon (Marathon de Toulouse Métropole) is an annual marathon road running event which takes place in Toulouse, France each October.

The first event was held in 2007 and due to its success has been organized annually. Since 2010 it is one of five French marathons to be awarded international status from the French Athletics Federation. In 2013 it was the venue for the French national marathon championships.

Winners

References
 Official Toulouse Marathon site

Marathons in France
Annual sporting events in France
Sport in Toulouse
Recurring sporting events established in 2007
2007 establishments in France
October sporting events
Autumn events in France